The Mississippi Headwaters State Forest is a state forest located near the town of Wilton in Beltrami County, Minnesota. Portions of the forest extend into the neighboring counties of Clearwater and Hubbard. The forest is named after its location immediately downstream (north) of Lake Itasca, the headwaters of the Mississippi River. 

The topography of the region, such as hills and flat outwash plains, are a result of the Wisconsinan glaciation. The sandy soil of the moraines are dominated by Eastern White Pine, Red Pine, oaks, maples, birch, and aspen; Black Spruce, Northern Whitecedar, and Tamarack are also present on the wet peat-like soils of the forest.

Popular outdoor recreational activities available revolve around the river and the 95 lakes and ponds within the forest, and include boating, canoeing, kayaking, and swimming. Trails are designated for hunting and dispersed camping. Trails are designated for hiking, mountain biking, and snowmobiling in the wintertime.

See also
List of Minnesota state forests
Mississippi River
Itasca State Park

External links
Mississippi Headwaters State Forest - Minnesota Department of Natural Resources (DNR)

References

Minnesota state forests
Protected areas of Beltrami County, Minnesota
Protected areas of Clearwater County, Minnesota
Protected areas of Hubbard County, Minnesota
Protected areas established in 1935
Headwaters State Forest